Abril Alejandra Rodríguez Fernández (born November 21, 1986) is a Mexican beauty contestant.

Abril Fernández competed against thirty-four other young women in the 2009 national Nuestra Belleza México pageant. She placed among the Top 10 and received the Personalidad Fraiche award.

References

1988 births
People from Saltillo
Living people
Beauty pageant contestants from Mexico